Tayport railway station served the town of Tayport, Fife, Scotland from 1848 to 1967 on the Newport Railway.

History 

The station opened on 17 May 1848 by the Edinburgh and Northern Railway as Ferryport-on-Craig but was renamed to its later name in 1851. It was east of Tayport Docks, which had freight sidings that served the docks themselves and a timber yard. The line to Leuchars was closed to passengers on 9 January 1956 and completely on 18 September 1967. Passenger service to Dundee was withdrawn on 22 May 1966 to facilitate construction of the Tay Road Bridge. The station officially closed to both passengers and goods traffic on 18 September 1967.

References 

Disused railway stations in Fife
Former North British Railway stations
Railway stations in Great Britain opened in 1848
Railway stations in Great Britain closed in 1967
1848 establishments in Scotland
1967 disestablishments in Scotland
Tayport